Nüsomurya (also, Nesamur’ya and Nyusomur’ya) is a village and municipality in the Lerik Rayon of Azerbaijan. It has a population of 225. The municipality consists of the villages of Nüsomurya and Qadimkücə.

References

External links

Populated places in Lerik District